Street Bandits is a 1951 American crime film directed by R. G. Springsteen, written by Milton Raison, and starring Penny Edwards, Robert Clarke, Ross Ford, Roy Barcroft, John Eldredge and Helen Wallace. It was released on November 15, 1951 by Republic Pictures.

Plot
Young lawyers Fred Palmer and Tom Reagan open an office down the hall from one occupied by L.T. Mitchell, who fronts a slot-machine operation run by Monk Walter, a brutal racketeer. Fred and Tom extend an invitation to a welcome party to Mitchell, who declines, but his stenographer Mildred Anderson accepts and quickly develops a romantic attraction to Fred.

Trouble brews when Tom disapproves of the way Fred is representing guilty clients including Walter, who commits violent crimes as soon as he's back on the street. Fred does it to make money for the firm, but ultimately Tom breaks up the partnership to become district attorney and Mildred, after marrying Fred, also leaves.

After the cold-blooded murder of Mitchell, a guilty conscience persuades Fred to change his ways, but Walter shoots him. Walter is killed during a police pursuit, Fred recovers in the hospital and Mildred returns to his side.

Cast    
Penny Edwards as Mildred Anderson
Robert Clarke as Fred Palmer
Ross Ford as Tom Reagan
Roy Barcroft as Monk Walter
John Eldredge as L.T. Mitchell
Helen Wallace as Mrs. Martha Palmer
Arthur Walsh as Arnold 'Blackie' Black
Harry Hayden as William Carrington
Emmett Vogan as District Attorney Burnell
Jane Adams as Jane Phillips
Charles Wagenheim as Gus Betts
Richard Bartlett as Johnny Mayer
Norman Field as Dr. Sawyer
Robert Long as The Judge
Dick Cogan as Court Clerk

References

External links 
 

1951 films
American crime films
1951 crime films
Republic Pictures films
Films directed by R. G. Springsteen
American black-and-white films
1950s English-language films
1950s American films